Rosa Conde Gutiérrez del Álamo (born 7 September 1947) is Spanish sociologist and politician. She served as Spokesperson of the Government from 1988 and 1993 and as Member of the Congress of Deputies from 1989 to 2004 representing Madrid.

Biography
Conde was born in Ronda, Spain. She took her degree and later taught at Complutense University of Madrid. She became the Spokesperson of the Spanish Government from 11 July 1988 until July 13, 1993 under the premiership of Felipe González. She took over from Javier Solana and operated at a ministerial level. After 1993, she continued serving the Premier as Secretary-General within the Cabinet Office.

After that she became the Director of the Carolina Foundation which is the body responsible for improving relations with Spanish speaking South America.

References

1947 births
Living people
People from Ronda
Spanish women sociologists